The Mink River is a river in the Hudson Bay drainage basin in Census Division No. 22 - Thompson-North Central, Northern Region, Manitoba, Canada. The Mink River's waters eventually flow into Gods Lake, and via the Gods River and the Hayes River into Hudson Bay.

See also
List of rivers of Manitoba

References

Rivers of Northern Manitoba
Tributaries of Hudson Bay